Eurybia lycisca, the blue-winged eurybia, is a butterfly of the family Riodinidae. It is found in from Mexico to Ecuador, including some Caribbean islands. The Eurybia lycisca is a nectar feeding butterfly that utilizes the Calathea flowers as a food source.

Larvae feed on Calathea lutea, C. crotalifera, C. inocephala, C. latifolia, C. warsczewisczia, and Ischnosiphon pruniosus. They also use the Calathea as a host plant.

References

Butterflies described in 1851
Riodininae
Riodinidae of South America
Taxa named by John O. Westwood